Anthony Brian Isaacs (born 8 April 1973) is an English former footballer who made 51 appearances in the Football League playing as a midfielder for Darlington. He also played non-league football for Bishop Auckland.

References

1973 births
Living people
Footballers from Middlesbrough
English footballers
Association football midfielders
Darlington F.C. players
Bishop Auckland F.C. players
English Football League players